Zone Zeal was the 2002 game for the FIRST Robotics Competition.  In it, robots playing in alliances of two competed to move goals and balls into various zones within the playing field.

Playing Field

The playing field was divided into fifths called zones. At the beginning of the match, there were 40 balls arranged along the sides of the field in the center zone and the two adjacent zones. In the center zone were three mobile goals.

The zones were numbered 1 to 5. The Blue team could score by placing ball-filled goals in zones 4 or 5, and could score a bonus 10 points for every goal in zone 4.  At the end of the match, for every robot Blue had in zone 1, Blue would score 10 points. For the red alliance, it was the opposite. Balls could be scored in zones 1 or 2, goals would receive bonus points for being in zone 2, and robots scored 10 points each for ending the match in zone 5.

Scoring
The primary source of points in Zone Zeal was placing balls in the mobile goals, then moving the goal into the appropriate zone. For every ball in a goal, an alliance received 1 point. For every goal in the alliance's goal zone at the end of the match, the alliance would receive 10 points. Further, the team received 10 points for every robot in the robot zone at the end of the match.

Events
The following regional events were held in 2002:
 Buckeye Regional - Cleveland, Ohio
 Canadian Regional - Mississauga, Ontario
 Great Lakes Regional - Ypsilanti, Michigan
 Johnson & Johnson Mid-Atlantic Regional - New Brunswick, New Jersey
 Lone Star Regional - Houston, Texas
 Motorola Midwest Regional - Evanston, Illinois
 NASA Kennedy Space Center Southeast Regional - Kennedy Space Center, Florida
 NASA Langley/VCU/School of Engineering - Richmond, Virginia
 New York City Regional - New York City
 Pacific Northwest Regional - Seattle, Washington
 Philadelphia Regional - Philadelphia, Pennsylvania 
 SBPLI Long Island Regional - Long Island, New York
 Silicon Valley Regional - San Jose, California
 Southern California Regional - Los Angeles, California
 Western Michigan Regional - Grand Rapids, Michigan
 UTC New England Regional - New Haven, Connecticut

The championship was held at Epcot Center, Disney World, Orlando.

References

Further reading

2002 in robotics
FIRST Robotics Competition games